Gastrotheca orophylax is a species of frog in the family Hemiphractidae.
It is found in Colombia and Ecuador.
Its natural habitats are subtropical or tropical moist montane forests and arable land.
It is threatened by habitat loss.

References

Gastrotheca
Amphibians of Colombia
Amphibians of Ecuador
Amphibians of the Andes
Taxonomy articles created by Polbot
Amphibians described in 1980